Manyar (pop. [1998] c. 15,000) is a village in Swat District, Khyber Pakhtunkhwa province, Pakistan. It is situated between the two villages of Ghaligay and Tindodag, 12 km southeast of Mingora. Its Union Council constituency is Ghaligay, Tehsil Barikot, District Swat. The village is a major tourist destination for its view of the sea, surrounding meadows, and hills. There is a beautiful and big Masjid called Cheena Masjid located in Barpalow in which the spring water is flowing for ablution which increases more the beauty of this village. The Manyar include Barpalow, Kozpalow, Gharib Abad, Kashala and Krash Machine places. There are about 16 Masajids in Manyar village.

Football is a major sport of Manyar. The team Manyar eleven is a winner of many tournaments played on district level on big big grounds.

Manyar was originally settled by Hindus, and is now the home of Pathans, people who speak Pashto and Pashto remain the local languages. The main source of local income is farming. The main religion of the region is Islam.

Swat District
Villages in Pakistan